Major General Alexander Vladimirovich Shishlyannikov is a Tajik military officer and the first Minister of Defence of Tajikistan, serving from 1993 to 1995. He is an ethnic Russian.

Biography

Soviet Army 
Alexander Shishlyannikov was born on November 3, 1950 in Tashkent, the capital of the Uzbek SSR. In 1971, he graduated from the Tashkent Higher Tank Command School in Chirchik, and 10 years later, he graduated from the Malinovsky Military Armored Forces Academy in Moscow. In the 1980s,  Shishlyannikov served in the Central and Turkestan Military District (based in the Kazakh and Uzbek capitals of Alma-Ata and Tashkent respectively), as well as the Western Group of Forces in East Germany. During this time, he was deployed with the Soviet 40th Army to Afghanistan in the early stages of the Soviet-Afghan War. By the time of the fall of the Soviet Union and the creation of independent nations, he was serving as an officer in the Uzbek defense ministry.

Tajikistan 
In January 1993, Colonel Shishlyannikov was appointed as the first defense minister of Tajikistan. He was among 200 officers brought from Uzbekistan on the orders of Emomali Rahmon. One month later on February 23, Shishlyannikov would lead the celebrations in honor of the founding of the Tajik Armed Forces. During his tenure, it was expected that he would temporary and would eventually be replaced by Colonel Ramazon Radjabov, his deputy who was in favor with many elite circles. 
Shishlyannikov played a key role in the early stages of the Tajik Civil War. In later July of that year, he hosted visiting Russian defence minister Pavel Grachev, where he criticized the position of "individual leaders of the CIS countries" for the proposals of the CIS Joint Armed Forces Command to bring peacekeeping forces into the republic being unfulfilled.

He was relieved of his post on April 7, 1995, being succeeded by Sherali Khayrulloyev.

References 

1950 births
Living people
Ministers of Defence of Tajikistan
Military personnel from Tashkent
Politicians from Tashkent
Tashkent Higher Tank Command School alumni
Tajikistani people of Russian descent